The "Zoque" is a variant of the very popular salmorejo in Málaga. It is a cold soup that has red vegetables, such as tomatoes, red pepper, and carrot, as its main ingredients. It differs from the gazpacho in that garlic and carrot are also used as ingredients. It also has a thicker texture than gazpacho. It is usually served cold with ham or shrimp.

Preparation and characteristics 
One feature of this soup is its creamy texture. The word "Zoque" has its origins in the Arabic language, "suqat", meaning waste or worthless item, indicating the use made of stale bread as one of its ingredients. It is customary to serve Zoque with grapes.

References

Spanish soups and stews